Gökçe Akyıldız  (born 30 October 1992) is a Turkish actress. She appeared in different films and television series as well as Zozan Firat in Hayat Devam Ediyor, Zeynep in Medcezir, Aslı in Fatih Harbiye and Songül in  Kırgın Çiçekler.

Biography 
Akyıldız was born on 30 October 1992 in Sinop, the third of four children. She has a twin sister, Gözde Akyıldız, who is a former child actress. She showed her interest in acting from an early age of five years old and in 2002 made her cinematic debut in Bir Tutam Baharat as Saime.

She later got role in a number of STV series, including Sırlar Dünyası, Büyük Buluşma and Beşinci Boyut. In 2005, she appeared with a different role in Zeynep. In 2006, she portrayed the character of Tekgül in Ezo Gelin.

She continued her career with roles in Parmaklıklar Ardında, Gazi and Kollama. Her breakthrough came in 2011 with her appearance in Hayat Devam Ediyor, and following that she got roles in the series Kötü Yol and Bizim Okul.

In 2013, she portrayed the character of Aslı in Fatih Harbiye. The series ended in 2014. She later appeared as Songül on ATV series Kırgın Çiçekler, which ended on 12 March 2018. She also played in a number of commercials for Lipton.

Filmography

References

External links 
 

1992 births
Living people
Turkish television actresses
Turkish film actresses
Turkish child actresses
21st-century Turkish actresses